Gabriel Stevenson, professionally known as Like, is an American record producer, rapper, DJ and songwriter. A three time Grammy nominee, he began working with the Pacific Division, a hip hop trio, better known as Pac Div in 2006.

In 2012, he produced Kendrick Lamar's "Sing About Me" on Good Kid, M.A.A.D City. He received two Grammy Award nominations at the 56th Grammy Awards: Album of the Year and Best Rap Album. In 2016, he produced Anderson .Paak's "Room in Here" featuring The Game and Sonyae Elise on the Malibu album. The album received a Grammy nomination for Best Urban Contemporary Album at the 59th Annual Grammy Awards. Like has production credit with artists such as Mac Miller, Ab-Soul, Joey Badass, Nick Grant, Asher Roth, Ill Camille and Currensy.

Like has released music as a solo artist. He released instrumental albums, Zesty and Lightwork in 2014 and Emeralds in 2016. On September 30, 2016, he released his first solo rap album, Songs Made While High, which features Anderson .Paak, Buddy, and Kali Uchis.

In 2017, Pac Div regrouped and are scheduled to release an album at the end of the year.

Discography

Instrumental / solo projects 
All Songs produced by Like

Pac Div studio albums

Pac Div mixtapes

Pac Div EPs

Production credits

Guest appearances
 List of features with other performing artists, showing year released and album name

Nominations and awards

Grammy Awards
The Grammy Awards are awarded annually by the National Academy of Recording Arts and Sciences of the United States. Like has received three nomination.

References

External links

Like AllMusic Page
Like Discogs Page

21st-century African-American male singers
American male singers
African-American male rappers
African-American record producers
American dance musicians
American DJs
American hip hop record producers
American multi-instrumentalists
East Coast hip hop musicians
American hip hop DJs
Rappers from Los Angeles
Living people
Pop rappers
21st-century American rappers
Record producers from California
21st-century American male musicians
Year of birth missing (living people)